Baron Hives, of Duffield in the County of Derby, is a title in the Peerage of the United Kingdom. It was created 7 July 1950 for the Ernest Hives, Chairman of Rolls-Royce Ltd.  the title is held by his grandson, the third Baron, who succeeded his uncle in 1997.

Baron Hives (1950)
Ernest Walter Hives, 1st Baron Hives (1886–1965)
John Warwick Hives, 2nd Baron Hives (1913–1997)
Matthew Peter Hives, 3rd Baron Hives (b. 1971)

The heir presumptive is present holder's cousin, Robert George Hives (b. 1953).
The heir presumptive's heir apparent is his son, William Duncan Hives (b. 1977).

Male-line family tree

Arms

References

Kidd, Charles, Williamson, David (editors). Debrett's Peerage and Baronetage (1990 edition). New York: St Martin's Press, 1990.

Baronies in the Peerage of the United Kingdom
Noble titles created in 1950